Lernik Harutyunyan  (born on May 16, 1981), is an Armenian actor. He is known for his role as Armoosh on Lost & Found in Armenia. He was also shot in German, Persian and French films.

Filmography

External links

References

1981 births
Living people
Armenian male film actors
21st-century Armenian male actors